Justin Terrell Gorham (born August 6, 1998) is an American professional basketball player for Rytas Vilnius of the Lithuanian Basketball League (LKL). He played college basketball for the Towson Tigers and the Houston Cougars.

High school career
Gorham attended Calvert Hall College High School in Towson, Maryland. A three-star recruit, he committed to playing college basketball for Towson. He was drawn to the program in part due to its proximity, allowing him to be close to his father, who had been diagnosed with duodenal cancer.

College career
As a freshman at Towson, Gorham averaged 2.8 points and 2.9 rebounds per game. He averaged 9.8 points and 6.7 rebounds per game as a sophomore, despite playing through an ankle sprain. For his junior season, Gorham transferred to Houston and sat out for one year due to transfer rules. He improved his shooting ability under the guidance of assistant coach Kellen Sampson. As a junior, Gorham averaged three points and 2.5 rebounds per game. 

He became a regular starter in his senior season. On January 3, 2021, Gorham posted 11 points and a career-high 19 rebounds in a 74–60 win over SMU. He collected Second Team All-American Athletic Conference (AAC) honors and was named AAC Most Improved Player at the conclusion of the season. Gorham averaged 8.4 points and 8.6 rebounds per game.

Professional career
After his time at Towson and Houston, Gorham signed on July 15, 2021 with Telekom Baskets Bonn of the German Basketball Bundesliga. In 2021-22 he averaged 9.0 points and 5.7 rebounds per game.

On July 21, 2022, Gorham signed with Hapoel Gilboa Galil of the Israeli Basketball Premier League.

On March 16, 2023, Gorham signed with Rytas Vilnius of the Lithuanian Basketball League (LKL).

Career statistics

College

|-
| style="text-align:left;"| 2016–17
| style="text-align:left;"| Towson
| 32 || 3 || 10.3 || .521 || – || .452 || 2.8 || .3 || .2 || .0 || 2.8
|-
| style="text-align:left;"| 2017–18
| style="text-align:left;"| Towson
| 32 || 9 || 23.0 || .538 || .214 || .709 || 6.7 || .8 || .3 || .2 || 9.8
|-
| style="text-align:left;"| 2018–19
| style="text-align:left;"| Houston
| style="text-align:center;" colspan="11"|  Redshirt
|-
| style="text-align:left;"| 2019–20
| style="text-align:left;"| Houston
| 30 || 0 || 12.9 || .341 || .303 || .793 || 2.5 || .5 || .1 || .1 || 3.0
|-
| style="text-align:left;"| 2020–21
| style="text-align:left;"| Houston
| 31 || 31 || 27.8 || .495 || .354 || .674 || 8.6 || 1.2 || .8 || .5 || 8.4
|- class="sortbottom"
| style="text-align:center;" colspan="2"| Career
| 125 || 43 || 18.5 || .493 || .316 || .675 || 5.2 || .7 || .4 || .2 || 6.0

Personal life
Gorham is the son of Tonya and Jerry Gorham. His father died from duodenal cancer in 2016, at age 53. He has an older brother, Gerald Jr.

References

External links
Houston Cougars bio
Towson Tigers bio
Proballers.com profile

1998 births
Living people
American expatriate basketball people in Germany
American expatriate basketball people in Israel
American expatriate basketball people in Lithuania
American men's basketball players
Basketball players from Maryland
BC Rytas players
Hapoel Gilboa Galil Elyon players
Houston Cougars men's basketball players
People from Columbia, Maryland
Power forwards (basketball)
Telekom Baskets Bonn players
Towson Tigers men's basketball players